is a Japanese manga series written and illustrated by Hideki Arai. It was serialized in Shogakukan's seinen manga magazine Weekly Young Sunday from 1997 to 2001, with its chapters collected in fourteen tankōbon volumes.

Publication
Written and illustrated by Hideki Arai, The World Is Mine was serialized in Shogakukan's seinen manga magazine Weekly Young Sunday from 1997 to 2001. Shogakukan collected its chapters in fourteen tankōbon volumes, released from June 5, 1997, to May 1, 2001. Enterbrain republished the manga in a five-volume revised edition, from August 31 to October 25, 2006.

The manga was licensed in France by Casterman and published under their Sakka imprint.

Reception
The manga was a finalist for the 4th and 6th installments of the Tezuka Osamu Cultural Prize in 2000 and 2002, respectively.

Tomo Machiyama of Pulp included the series on the "Most Hellish (Untranslated) Manga....ever!!!" list. Machiyama described the series as "A Clockwork Orange meets Natural Born Killers". Machiyama said that the story "sounds really stupid and meaningless", but that it is "meticulously rendered in detailed super-realism", highlighting its art. Machiyama concluded: "To get through this comic is a challenge to your humanity."

Legacy
Manga author Tatsuki Fujimoto commented the influence that Arai's The World Is Mine and Kiichi!! had on his manga series Fire Punch. Film director  said that the manga influenced him for the 2016 film .

References

Further reading

External links

Seinen manga
Shogakukan manga
Terrorism in fiction